On 29 November 1991, sixty armed Islamist militants led by Aïssa Messaoudi, an Algerian Islamist who fought in the Soviet–Afghan War and had connections with Takfir wal-Hijra and the Islamic Salvation Front, attacked a border post in Guemmar, Algeria, killing 3 policemen. This has been considered as the first act of jihad against the government and beginning of the Armed Islamic Movement, prior to the beginning of the proper Algerian Civil War.

Background 
The weeks before the declaration by the Islamic Salvation Front saw a few violent incidents by Islamist militants. Ahmed Ben Bella frequently had his meetings disrupted by stone-throwing Islamists, and on one occasion Islamist militants attacked a residence of the FLN where Mouloud Hamrouche was holding a meeting on 1 November. These became more serious when police discovered significant caches of arms in El Oued, leading to shootout incidents with militants.

Attack 
On 29 November 1991, 60 Islamist militants attacked a border post in Guemmar and the heads of army conscripts were cut off, 3 policemen were killed. The government claimed these attacks were indications of a planned Islamist terrorist campaign against the state, and were acknowledged to have been led by Aïssa Messaoudi who the police were seeking to hunt down.

References 

1991 in Algeria
Algerian Civil War
Terrorism in Algeria